Shamil Magomedbashirovich Saidov (born 21 March 1982) is a former Russian professional football player.

Club career
He made his Russian Football National League debut for FC Anzhi Makhachkala on 26 May 2004 in a game against FC Dynamo Bryansk. He played one more season in the FNL for Anzhi.

External links
 
 

1982 births
Footballers from Makhachkala
Living people
Russian footballers
Association football goalkeepers
FC Anzhi Makhachkala players
FC Arsenal Tula players
FC Lokomotiv Nizhny Novgorod players
Turan-Tovuz IK players
Azerbaijan Premier League players
Russian expatriate footballers
Expatriate footballers in Azerbaijan